The cisterna chyli or receptaculum chyli (chy·​li pronounced: ˈkī-ˌlī) is a dilated sac at the lower end of the thoracic duct in most mammals into which lymph from the intestinal trunk and two lumbar lymphatic trunks flow. It receives fatty chyle from the intestines and thus acts as a conduit for the lipid products of digestion. It is the most common drainage trunk of most of the body's lymphatics. The cisterna chyli is a retroperitoneal structure.

Structure 
In humans, the cisterna chyli is located posterior to the abdominal aorta on the anterior aspect of the bodies of the first and second lumbar vertebrae (L1 and L2). There it forms the beginning of the primary lymph vessel, the thoracic duct, which transports lymph and chyle from the abdomen via the aortic opening of the diaphragm up to the junction of left subclavian vein and internal jugular veins.

Other animals 
In dogs, the cisterna chyli is located to the left and often ventral to the aorta; in cats it is left and dorsal; in guinea pigs it runs to the left and drains into the left innominate vein.

Gallery

See also
 Lymphatic system

References

External links
  - "Posterior Abdominal Wall: The Cisterna Chyli"
 Diagram at ccri.edu at ccri.edu

Lymphatics of the torso